María Sefidari Huici (born 1982) was the chair of the Wikimedia Foundation Board of Trustees until June 3, 2021. She was re-elected to the position in August 2019. Sefidari was named a Techweek "Women's Leadership Fellow" in 2014. In 2018, an essay she wrote about the upcoming European copyright reform was widely covered, including by TechCrunch and Boing Boing.

Wikipedia experience
Sefidari discovered Wikipedia when her little sister explained that it was a website that anyone can edit. "Everything begins," she said in an interview with online newspaper elDiario.es, "when you start to get involved in a topic and spend many hours improving articles, and you see that there are Wikipedia policies that should be changed." Shortly afterwards, she launched :LGBT to give visibility to these groups and improve and organize all the contents related to this topic, taking inspiration from English Wikipedia's WikiProject LGBT studies. She has also worked to close Spanish Wikipedia's gender bias.

In 2012, she was elected a member of the Chapters' Committee (ChapCom), the Wikimedia community committee entrusted with advising the Wikimedia Foundation Board of Trustees on the approval of new national or subnational chapters. In mid-2012, following a community discussion and a resulting Board of Trustees' resolution, the scope of the committee was expanded and it transitioned into the Affiliations Committee (AffCom), and now includes thematic organisations and user groups.

In 2015, she gave a conference on Wikimedia at King Juan Carlos University on their Digital Communication, Culture and Citizenship program. In 2017–2018, she was in charge of the discipline "Communities in Network: Cooperative creation at the Internet", provided by Wikimedia Spain, as part of a master's degree on communication, culture and digital citizenship, at the same university.

Wikimedia Foundation Board 
In June 2013, Sefidari was elected to the Wikimedia Foundation Board of Trustees by the community of Wikipedia editors. Her term expired in June 2015. In 2016, she was appointed to the Board to fill a vacancy. She was elected to the position of chair in July 2018, a position she would hold until her resignation from the board in 2021. In March 2020, Sefidari requested a four-month leave from the Board, in preparation for her upcoming maternity, being replaced in the role by Nataliia Tymkiv, as acting vice-chair of the board.

Professional career
Sefidari received a bachelor's degree in psychology and a master's degree in management and tourism from Complutense University of Madrid.

References

External links

 
 
 Interview with Maria Sefidari on The Objective

1982 births
Living people
Wikimedia Foundation Board of Trustees members
Complutense University of Madrid alumni
Wikipedia people
People from Madrid